Zitong may refer to:

 Zitong County (梓潼县), a county in Sichuan Province, China
 Zitong (dictionary) (字通), a Song-dynasty Chinese dictionary